Clayton Fegley is an American politician who has served in the North Dakota House of Representatives from the 4th district since 2018. He serves alongside Terry Jones. Fegley is a Republican.

References

External links
Representative Clayton Fegley – North Dakota Legislative Branch

Living people
Year of birth missing (living people)
Republican Party members of the North Dakota House of Representatives
21st-century American politicians